Uganda Clays Limited (UCL), commonly referred to as Uganda Clays, is a building materials manufacturer in Uganda. The company manufactures baked clay building products, using Italian-made heavy clay processing machinery. The clay is excavated using surface mining techniques. The company is listed on the Uganda Securities Exchange (USE), being the first equity to list on the exchange in 2000.

Products
UCL's products include roofing tiles, bricks, interlocking and corner blocks, partitioning blocks, decorative grilles, ventilators, floor tiles, pipes, and cable covers. Of UCL's products, roofing tiles and bricks account for the largest portion of revenues generated from sales contributing 53 percent and 11 percent, respectively. The company sells its products within the East African Community and in the eastern Democratic Republic of the Congo. The civil war in South Sudan forced UCL to close operations in that country in 2014.

Overview
As of December 2021, the total assets of the company were valued at UGX:74.5 billion (US$21.3 million). During the financial year ending 31 December 2021, the company had a pre-tax profit of UShs17.2 billion (US$4.9 million).

To reduce operational expenses, the company switched from using heavy fuel oil to coffee husks, as the power source to fire its furnaces, starting in 2015.

History
UCL was started on 10 July 1950 by two private investors. In 1969, ownership of the company was turned over to Westomat Construction and Engineering Corporation (WCEC). In 1977, WCEC sold 75 percent of UCL to the National Housing and Construction Company, a parastatal company of the Ugandan government. Shareholding in UCL has changed hands many times. Over the years, the following entities have held partial ownership in the company:

 Government of Uganda
 White Tower Corporation
 Kenya Clay Products Limited (KCPL)
 Barclays Bank of Uganda
 Uganda Communications Employees Pension Scheme
 National Social Security Fund (Uganda)
 National Insurance Corporation
 Employees of Uganda Clays Limited
 Individual Investors

Ownership
As of 31 March 2018, the shareholding in the stock of the company, was as depicted in the table below:

It is expected that in 2018, the debt amounting to USh23.2 billion that is owed to NSSF will be converted to equity, raising NSSF's shareholding from the current 33 percent to 66 percent. In July 2018, the Daily Monitor reported that the company was searching for a strategic investor, to increase the company's capital and facilitate the acquisition of new, modern production technology.

Governance and management
UCL is governed by a nine-person board of directors, chaired by Martin Kasekende, an independent non-executive director. The company is divided into five administrative departments under the overall supervision of the managing director, Reuben Tumwebaze.

Facilities
As of 31 December 2014, UCL operated two factories:

 The main factory, located in Kajjansi, Wakiso District, near Entebbe - Employed 512 people.
 The second factory, located in Kamonkoli, Budaka District, near Mbale - Employed 140 people.

References

External links
Uganda Clays Limited Homepage
Uganda Clays sacks Inholo, appoints finance boss to act As of 11 March 2020.
NSSF Uganda struggling to find a buyer for UCL As of 10 September 2018.

Companies listed on the Uganda Securities Exchange
Manufacturing companies of Uganda
1950 establishments in Uganda
Manufacturing companies established in 1950
Organisations based in Kajjansi
Brick manufacturers
Wakiso District